Vilbaldr Dufþaksson (fl. 980s;;) was a Norse-Gael settler in Iceland, mentioned in the Landnámabók. He was the great-grandson of Cerball mac Dúnlainge, king of Osraige from 842 to 888, via an otherwise unknown son of Cerball, called Dufnial (Domnall). 
His brother was one Askell hnokkan, and his sons were Bjouok and Bjolan.

Family tree

   Dungal, d 842.
   |__
   |                 |                |
   Cerball, d 888.   Riacan, d 894.   Land, d 890. + Mael Sechnaill  + Aed Finlaith  + Gaethine
   |___
   |                  |         |                  |                   |         |                    |                        |
   Diarmait, d 928.   Cuilde    Ceallach, d 908.   Rafarta + Eyvindr   Domnall   Kormled + Grimolfr   Frithgertr + Iorirhima   Ethna + Hlodvir
   |                            |_                     |                 |                                           |
   |                            |                 |                    |                 |                                           |
   ?                            Donnchad, d 976.  Cuilen, d 933.       Dufpakr           Porgrimr                                    Sigurd digri, Earl of Orkney, d 1014.
   |                            |                                      |_
   |                            |                                      |         |
   Ceallach, d 1003.            Gilla Patraic, d 996.                  Vilbadr   Askell hnokhan
                                |                                      |_
                                |                                      |         |
                                Mac Giolla Padhraic                    Bjollok   Bjolan
                                |
                                |
                                Kings of Osraighe

See also
 Cerball mac Dúnlainge
 Landnámabók

References
 Donnchadh Ó Corráin, Viking Ireland - Afterthoughts, pages 441 and 445, in Ireland and Scandinavia in the Early Viking Age, (ed). Howard B. Clarke, Maire Ni Mhaonaigh and Raghnall Ó Floinn, Four Courts Press, Dublin, 1998. 

10th-century Irish people
Irish emigrants to Iceland
10th-century Icelandic people